Pestovo is a rural locality (a village) in Mayskoye Rural Settlement, Vologodsky District, Vologda Oblast, Russia. The population was 39 as of 2002.

Geography 
Pestovo is located 22 km northwest of Vologda (the district's administrative centre) by road. Skresenskoye is the nearest rural locality.

References 

Rural localities in Vologodsky District